Villa Medici or Palazzo Medici can refer to several buildings in Italy:

Villa Medici, Rome
Medici villas, Tuscany
Palazzo Medici, Florence

Architectural disambiguation pages